Ann Mills was a British woman who disguised herself as a man in order to become a dragoon. In 1740 she fought on the frigate HMS Maidenstone.

References
 "Gendered War and Military", retrieved 10 February 2006
 Felsenstien, Frank: Unraveling Ann Mills. Some thoughts on Gender Construction and Naval Heroism (2006)
 Bandits at Sea: A Pirates Reader
 Strange Pages from Family Papers

British Army soldiers
British Army personnel of the War of the Austrian Succession
Female wartime cross-dressers
Dragoons
Year of death missing
Year of birth missing